Crataegus meyeri is a species of hawthorn found in Belarus, European Russia, Ukraine including Crimea, Anatolia, the Transcaucasus, Iraq and Iran. Trees, they are found in scrubby areas and forest openings on drier mountain slopes, typically in association with Quercus. A 2014 molecular and morphological study reduced Crataegus ucrainica and Crataegus × yosgatica to synonyms of Crataegus meyeri.

References

meyeri
Plants described in 1939